A power of two is a number of the form  where  is an integer, that is, the result of exponentiation with number two as the base and integer  as the exponent.

In a context where only integers are considered,  is restricted to non-negative values, so there are 1, 2, and 2 multiplied by itself a certain number of times.

1, 2, 4, 8, 16, 32, 64, 128, 256, 512, ... 

Because two is the base of the binary numeral system, powers of two are common in computer science. Written in binary, a power of two always has the form 100...000 or 0.00...001, just like a power of 10 in the decimal system.

Computer science 
A word, interpreted as an unsigned integer, can represent values from 0 () to  () inclusively. Corresponding signed integer values can be positive, negative and zero; see signed number representations. Either way, one less than a power of two is often the upper bound of an integer in binary computers. As a consequence, numbers of this form show up frequently in computer software. For example, in the original Legend of Zelda the main character was limited to carrying 255 rupees (the currency of the game) at any given time, and the video game Pac-Man famously has a kill screen at level 256.

Powers of two are often used to measure computer memory.  A byte is now considered eight bits (an octet), resulting in the possibility of 256 values (28).  (The term byte once meant (and in some cases, still means) a collection of bits, typically of 5 to 32 bits, rather than only an 8-bit unit.)  The prefix kilo, in conjunction with byte, may be, and has traditionally been, used, to mean 1,024 (210). However, in general, the term kilo has been used in the International System of Units to mean 1,000 (103). Binary prefixes have been standardized, such as kibi (Ki) meaning 1,024. Nearly all processor registers have sizes that are powers of two, 32 or 64 being very common.

Powers of two occur in a range of other places as well. For many disk drives, at least one of the sector size, number of sectors per track, and number of tracks per surface is a power of two. The logical block size is almost always a power of two.

Numbers that are not powers of two occur in a number of situations, such as video resolutions, but they are often the sum or product of only two or three powers of two, or powers of two minus one. Put another way, they have fairly regular bit patterns.

Mersenne and Fermat primes 
A prime number that is one less than a power of two is called a Mersenne prime. For example, the prime number 31 is a Mersenne prime because it is 1 less than 32 (25). Similarly, a prime number (like 257) that is one more than a positive power of two is called a Fermat prime—the exponent  itself is a power of two.  A fraction that has a power of two as its denominator is called a dyadic rational. The numbers that can be represented as sums of consecutive positive integers are called polite numbers; they are exactly the numbers that are not powers of two.

Euclid's Elements, Book IX 
The geometric progression 1, 2, 4, 8, 16, 32, ... (or, in the binary numeral system, 1, 10, 100, 1000, 10000, 100000, ... ) is important in number theory. Book IX, Proposition 36 of Elements proves that if the sum of the first  terms of this progression is a prime number (and thus is a Mersenne prime as mentioned above), then this sum times the th term is a perfect number. For example, the sum of the first 5 terms of the series 1 + 2 + 4 + 8 + 16 = 31, which is a prime number. The sum 31 multiplied by 16 (the 5th term in the series) equals 496, which is a perfect number.

Book IX, Proposition 35, proves that in a geometric series if the first term is subtracted from the second and last term in the sequence, then as the excess of the second is to the first—so is the excess of the last to all those before it. (This is a restatement of our formula for geometric series from above.) Applying this to the geometric progression 31, 62, 124, 248, 496 (which results from 1, 2, 4, 8, 16 by multiplying all terms by 31), we see that 62 minus 31 is to 31 as 496 minus 31 is to the sum of 31, 62, 124, 248. Therefore, the numbers 1, 2, 4, 8, 16, 31, 62, 124 and 248 add up to 496 and further these are all the numbers that divide 496. For suppose that  divides 496 and it is not amongst these numbers. Now  cannot divide 16 or it would be amongst the numbers 1, 2, 4, 8 or 16.
Therefore, 31 cannot divide . And since 31 does not divide  and  measures 496, the fundamental theorem of arithmetic implies that  must divide 16 and be amongst the numbers 1, 2, 4, 8 or 16. Let  be 4, then  must be 124, which is impossible since by hypothesis  is not amongst the numbers 1, 2, 4, 8, 16, 31, 62, 124 or 248.

Table of values 

Starting with 2 the last digit is periodic with period 4, with the cycle 2–4–8–6–, and starting with 4 the last two digits are periodic with period 20. These patterns are generally true of any power, with respect to any base.

Powers of 1024  

The first few powers of 210 are slightly larger than those same powers of 1000 (103):

Powers of two whose exponents are powers of two 
Because data (specifically integers) and the addresses of data are stored using the same hardware, and the data is stored in one or more octets, double exponentials of two are common. For example,

Several of these numbers represent the number of values representable using common computer data types. Also see tetration and lower hyperoperations. For more about representing signed numbers see two's complement.

In a connection with nimbers, these numbers are often called Fermat 2-powers.

The numbers  form an irrationality sequence: for every sequence  of positive integers, the series

converges to an irrational number. Despite the rapid growth of this sequence, it is the slowest-growing irrationality sequence known.

Selected powers of two 
 28 = 256
The number of values represented by the 8 bits in a byte, more specifically termed as an octet.  (The term byte is often defined as a collection of bits rather than the strict definition of an 8-bit quantity, as demonstrated by the term kilobyte.)
 210 = 1,024
 The binary approximation of the kilo-, or 1,000 multiplier, which causes a change of prefix. For example: 1,024 bytes = 1 kilobyte (or kibibyte).
 212 = 4,096
 The hardware page size of an Intel x86-compatible processor.
 215 = 32,768
 The number of non-negative values for a signed 16-bit integer.
 216 = 65,536
 The number of distinct values representable in a single word on a 16-bit processor, such as the original x86 processors.
 The maximum range of a short integer variable in the C#, Java, and SQL programming languages. The maximum range of a Word or Smallint variable in the Pascal programming language.
 The number of binary relations on a 4-element set.
 220 = 1,048,576
 The binary approximation of the mega-, or 1,000,000 multiplier, which causes a change of prefix. For example: 1,048,576 bytes = 1 megabyte (or mebibyte).
 224 = 16,777,216
 The number of unique colors that can be displayed in truecolor, which is used by common computer monitors.
 This number is the result of using the three-channel RGB system, with 8 bits for each channel, or 24 bits in total.
 The size of the largest unsigned integer or address in computers with 24-bit registers or data buses.
 229 = 536,870,912
 The largest power of two with distinct digits in base ten.
 230 = 1,073,741,824
 The binary approximation of the giga-, or 1,000,000,000 multiplier, which causes a change of prefix. For example, 1,073,741,824 bytes = 1 gigabyte (or gibibyte).
 231 = 2,147,483,648
 The number of non-negative values for a signed 32-bit integer. Since Unix time is measured in seconds since January 1, 1970, it will run out at 2,147,483,647 seconds or 03:14:07 UTC on Tuesday, 19 January 2038 on 32-bit computers running Unix, a problem known as the year 2038 problem.
 232 = 4,294,967,296
 The number of distinct values representable in a single word on a 32-bit processor. Or, the number of values representable in a doubleword on a 16-bit processor, such as the original x86 processors.
 The range of an int variable in the Java, C#, and SQL programming languages.
 The range of a Cardinal or Integer variable in the Pascal programming language.
 The minimum range of a long integer variable in the C and C++ programming languages.
 The total number of IP addresses under IPv4. Although this is a seemingly large number, the number of available 32-bit IPv4 addresses has been exhausted (but not for IPv6 addresses).
 The number of binary operations with domain equal to any 4-element set, such as GF(4).
 240 = 1,099,511,627,776
 The binary approximation of the tera-, or 1,000,000,000,000 multiplier, which causes a change of prefix. For example, 1,099,511,627,776 bytes = 1 terabyte or tebibyte.
 250 = 1,125,899,906,842,624
 The binary approximation of the peta-, or 1,000,000,000,000,000 multiplier. 1,125,899,906,842,624 bytes = 1 petabyte or pebibyte.
 253 = 9,007,199,254,740,992
 The number until which all integer values can exactly be represented in IEEE double precision floating-point format. Also the first power of 2 to start with the digit 9 in decimal.
 256 = 72,057,594,037,927,936
 The number of different possible keys in the obsolete 56 bit DES symmetric cipher.
 260 = 1,152,921,504,606,846,976
 The binary approximation of the exa-, or 1,000,000,000,000,000,000 multiplier.  1,152,921,504,606,846,976 bytes = 1 exabyte or exbibyte.
 263 = 9,223,372,036,854,775,808
 The number of non-negative values for a signed 64-bit integer.
 263 − 1, a common maximum value (equivalently the number of positive values) for a signed 64-bit integer in programming languages.
 264 = 18,446,744,073,709,551,616
 The number of distinct values representable in a single word on a 64-bit processor. Or, the number of values representable in a doubleword on a 32-bit processor. Or, the number of values representable in a quadword on a 16-bit processor, such as the original x86 processors.
 The range of a long variable in the Java and C# programming languages.
 The range of a Int64 or QWord variable in the Pascal programming language.
 The total number of IPv6 addresses generally given to a single LAN or subnet.
 264 − 1, the number of grains of rice on a chessboard, according to the old story, where the first square contains one grain of rice and each succeeding square twice as many as the previous square. For this reason the number is sometimes known as the "chess number".
 264 − 1 is also the number of moves required to complete the legendary 64-disk version of the Tower of Hanoi.
 268 = 295,147,905,179,352,825,856
 The first power of 2 to contain all decimal digits. 
 270 = 1,180,591,620,717,411,303,424
 The binary approximation of the zetta-, or 1,000,000,000,000,000,000,000 multiplier. 1,180,591,620,717,411,303,424 bytes = 1 zettabyte (or zebibyte).
 280 = 1,208,925,819,614,629,174,706,176
 The binary approximation of the yotta-, or 1,000,000,000,000,000,000,000,000 multiplier. 1,208,925,819,614,629,174,706,176 bytes = 1 yottabyte (or yobibyte).
 286 = 77,371,252,455,336,267,181,195,264
 286 is conjectured to be the largest power of two not containing a zero in decimal.
 296 = 79,228,162,514,264,337,593,543,950,336
 The total number of IPv6 addresses generally given to a local Internet registry. Thus, 296 addresses.
 2108 = 324,518,553,658,426,726,783,156,020,576,256
 The largest known power of 2 not containing a 9 in decimal. 
 2126 = 85,070,591,730,234,615,865,843,651,857,942,052,864
 The largest known power of 2 not containing a pair of consecutive equal digits. 
 2128 = 
 The total number of IP addresses available under IPv6. Also the number of distinct universally unique identifiers (UUIDs).
 2168 = 
 The largest known power of 2 not containing all decimal digits (the digit 2 is missing in this case). 
 2192 = 
 The total number of different possible keys in the AES 192-bit key space (symmetric cipher).
 2229 = 862,718,293,348,820,473,429,344,482,784,628,181,556,388,621,521,298,319,395,315,527,974,912
 2229 is the largest known power of two containing the least number of zeros relative to its power. It is conjectured by Metin Sariyar that every digit 0 to 9 is inclined to appear an equal number of times in the decimal expansion of power of two as the power increases.  
 2256 = 
 The total number of different possible keys in the AES 256-bit key space (symmetric cipher).
 2333 = 
 The smallest power of 2 greater than a googol (10100).
 21024 = 
 The maximum number that can fit in a 64-bit IEEE double-precision floating-point format (approximately 1.79×10308), and hence the maximum number that can be represented by many programs, for example Microsoft Excel.
 282,589,933 = 
 One more than the largest known prime number . It has 24,862,047 digits.

Other properties

Consider the set of all -digit binary integers. It is also the sums of the cardinalities of certain subsets: the subset of integers with no 1s (consisting of a single number, written as  0s), the subset with a single 1, the subset with two 1s, and so on up to the subset with  1s (consisting of the number written as  1s).

Currently, powers of two are the only known almost perfect numbers.

Similarly, the number of -faces of an -dimensional cross-polytope is also  and the formula for the number of -faces an -dimensional cross-polytope has is 

The sum of the reciprocals of the powers of two is 1. The sum of the reciprocals of the squared powers of two (powers of four) is 1/3.

The smallest natural power of two whose decimal representation begins with 7 is
 

Every power of 2 (excluding 1) can be written as the sum of four square numbers in 24 ways. The powers of 2 are the natural numbers greater than 1 that can be written as the sum of four square numbers in the fewest ways.

As a real polynomial, an + bn is irreducible, if and only if n is a power of two. (If n is odd, then an + bn is divisible by a+n, and if n is even but not a power of 2, then n can be written as n=mp, where m is odd, and thus , which is divisible by ap + bp.)
But in the domain of complex numbers, the polynomial  (where n>=1) can always be factorized as
, 
even if n is a power of two.

Powers of two in music theory 

In musical notation, all unmodified note values have a duration equal to a whole note divided by a power of two; for example a half note (1/2), a quarter note (1/4), an eighth note (1/8) and a sixteenth note (1/16). Dotted or otherwise modified notes have other durations. In time signatures the lower numeral, the beat unit, which can be seen as the denominator of a fraction, is almost always a power of two.

If the ratio of frequencies of two pitches is a power of two, then the interval between those pitches is full octaves. In this case, the corresponding notes have the same name.

See also
 2048 (video game)
 Binary number
 Fermi–Dirac prime
 Geometric progression
 Gould's sequence
 Inchworm Song
 Integer binary logarithm
 Octave (electronics)
 Power of 10
 Power of three 
 Sum-free sequence

References

Binary arithmetic
Integer sequences
Integers